The 2020 London Marathon was the 40th running of the annual marathon race in London, United Kingdom, which took place on 4 October 2020. Due to the COVID-19 pandemic, the race was postponed from 26 April and only allowed elite participants; the mass participation event was cancelled. The event used a different course from usual, consisting of multiple laps around St James's Park.

The men's elite race was won by Ethiopian Shura Kitata, and the women's event was won by Kenyan Brigid Kosgei. The men's wheelchair race was won by Canadian Brent Lakatos, and the women's event was won by Dutchwoman Nikita den Boer.

Background

The 2020 London Marathon was originally scheduled to be held on 26 April but was postponed until 4 October due to the COVID-19 pandemic. It was the first London Marathon to be run in the autumn. On 6 August, it was confirmed that the marathon would go ahead as an elite-only race, with the mass participation event cancelled. Fields of around 30–40 athletes competed for each title. It was the first time that the London Marathon was solely an elite-only event. Due to the COVID-19 pandemic, the race was run without spectators, in a biosecure environment. All athletes were tested for COVID-19 multiple times before the race, and wore face coverings and observed social distancing when not competing. All competitors and event co-ordinators wore a "bump" device which alerted them if they got too close to other people.

As a result of the need for a biosecure environment, the race did not follow its traditional route. Instead, the 2020 London Marathon consisted of 19 laps of length  around St James's Park, followed by  along The Mall, following the finish line of the traditional London Marathon course. The circuits took in The Mall, Horse Guards Parade, Birdcage Walk and Buckingham Palace. The area around St James's Park was closed to prohibit spectators from attending.

The prize money for winners of the 2020 London Marathon was 50 per cent lower than in 2019. For the first time, there was separate prize money awarded to the highest finishing British athletes in the race. The winner's prize money was US$30,000. British competitors who achieved the Olympic qualifying standard at the 2020 London Marathon would have their time count towards the qualification criteria at the delayed 2020 Summer Olympics in Tokyo in 2021. Before both events were postponed, the London Marathon had been scheduled to be used as the British trial event to determine qualification for the 2020 Olympics.

The 2021 London Marathon was postponed from April until October 2021, to maximise the chance of being able to hold a mass participation event.

Competitors

The women's race included 2019 winner and current marathon world record holder Brigid Kosgei, 2018 winner Vivian Cheruiyot, as well as Ruth Chepng'etich, Roza Dereje, and Valary Jemeli Aiyabei, all of whom had personal best times under 2:20. Ethiopian Degitu Azimeraw was scheduled to race, but withdrew after testing positive for COVID-19.

The favourites for the men's race were 2019 winner Eliud Kipchoge and Kenenisa Bekele, who won the 2019 Berlin Marathon in 2:01:41, two seconds away from Kipchoge's world record. The men's race also featured  Mosinet Geremew, Mule Wasihun, Sisay Lemma, and Tamirat Tola, all of whom had personal best times under 2:05. Sondre Nordstad Moen, who broke the European one hour run record earlier in 2020, also competed. Briton Mo Farah, who in September 2020 set the men's world record for the one hour run, acted as a pacemaker for the men's race. Two days before the race, Kenenisa Bekele withdrew from the London Marathon with a calf injury. American Galen Rupp, who won his country's Olympic qualifying event in February 2020, did not compete, after undergoing surgery for an existing injury.

The men's wheelchair race featured 10 competitors. 2019 winner Daniel Romanchuk was scheduled to race, but later decided not to attend the event. The race featured Marcel Hug, who won the London Marathon in 2014 and 2016, and was the only man to have beaten Romanchuk in a marathon since March 2019. Other competitors included British eight-time winner David Weir, 2010 winner Josh Cassidy, and Sho Watanabe, who came second at the 2020 Tokyo Marathon.

The women's wheelchair race featured six competitors. 2019 winner Manuela Schär competed at the 2020 race, and former women's winner Shelly Woods raced in what was her first event for four years.

Race summary

There were three separate races: the women's race started at 7:15 BST (UTC+1), the men's event started at 10:15 BST, and the wheelchair marathon started at 13:10 BST. All of the races were run in heavy rain due to Storm Alex, which made them the wettest London Marathon in history. The conditions inhibited any chance of world records being broken at the event; world record attempts had been thought possible due to the flatness of the 2020 marathon course.

In the women's race, 2019 winner Brigid Kosgei retained her title, winning by over three minutes. Kosgei broke away from the pack  into the race, and stayed ahead for the rest of the race. She finished in a time of 2:18.58. Hall finished second, in a personal best time, and Chepng'etich third. Hall's second place was the first time that an American had finished in the top three of the London Marathon since 2006, when Deena Kastor won the race. It was also the first time that a non-African had finished in the top three of the event since 2013, when Japan's Yukiko Akaba finished third. Natasha Cockram won the prize for best British finisher, although she was outside the Olympic qualifying time. After the race, Chepng'etich said that she had struggled with the cold, wet conditions.

In the men's race, Shura Kitata won a sprint finish with Vincent Kipchumba and Sisay Lemma, who finished second and third respectively. Shura finished in a time of 2:05:41. The front group completed the first half of the marathon in 1:02:54, and with  left in the race, there was a group of nine contenders for the victory. At that point, Shura moved to the front of the field and accelerated the pace. 2019 winner Eliud Kipchoge was dropped from the leading group, and eventually finished in eighth place. It was the first time since 2013 that Kipchoge had lost a marathon race, and after the race, Kipchoge said that he ran the last  with a blocked ear. It was Kipchoge's second slowest marathon time. Jonathan Mellor won the prize for best British finisher. He and Ben Connor finished within the Olympic qualifying time.

The men's wheelchair race was won by Canadian Brent Lakatos in a sprint finish involving six athletes. With two laps to go, Lakatos decided to move to the front of the group, and he remained there until the finish. David Weir and Marcel Hug finished second and third respectively, and Sho Watanabe, Jordi Madera, and Kota Hokinoue were also involved in the final sprint. Hug and Watanabe finished with exactly the same time. Lakatos was the first Canadian to finish on the podium in the London Marathon men's wheelchair event for 10 years.

The women's wheelchair was won by Nikita den Boer, who finished 82 seconds clear of pre-race favourite Manuela Schär. American Jenna Fesemyer finished third, over 12 minutes behind den Boer. It was den Boer's first World Marathon Majors victory, and she was the first Dutch person to win a London Marathon wheelchair race. Den Boer beat her previous personal best by over 10 minutes, and due to her victory, she qualified for the delayed 2020 Summer Paralympics. Schär had won the previous nine World Marathon Majors races that she competed in.

Results
Only the top 20 finishers in each race are listed.

Men

Source:

Women

Source:

Wheelchair men

Source:

Wheelchair women

Source:

Virtual marathon
A virtual marathon event was also held to allow people to run a marathon distance and record their own times. The virtual race had an entry fee, with all proceeds going to charity. Competitors who completed a virtual marathon on 4 October and recorded it on the official app received a medal, as they would do for finishing a traditional London Marathon. The times from the virtual race can be used for people wanting to enter the 2021 mass participation event. Over 43,000 people ran a virtual London Marathon. In January 2021, the virtual event received a Guinness World Record for most users to run an organised remote marathon in 24 hours.

Notes

See also
 Impact of the COVID-19 pandemic on sports

References

External links
 

2020
2020 marathons
Marathon
2020s in the City of Westminster
October 2020 sports events in the United Kingdom
Sport in the City of Westminster
Athletics (track and field) events postponed due to the COVID-19 pandemic